In Greek mythology, Euphemus (Ancient Greek: Εὔφημος Eὔphēmos,  "reputable") was the name of several distinct characters:

 Euphemus, son of Poseidon and an Argonaut.
 Euphemus, a descendant of the river god Axius and the father of the hero Eurybarus who defeated the female monster Sybaris.
 Euphemus, father of Daedalus by Hyginus, possibly by mistake instead of Eupalamus.
 Euphemus, son of Troezenus and a leader of the Thracian Cicones. He was an ally of the Trojans. According to late writers, he was killed either by Achilles or by one of the following four: Diomedes, Idomeneus and the two Ajaxes who at one point united to attack the opponents.
 Euphemus, surname of Zeus on Lesbos.

Notes

References 

 Antoninus Liberalis, The Metamorphoses of Antoninus Liberalis translated by Francis Celoria (Routledge 1992). Online version at the Topos Text Project.
 Apollonius Rhodius, Argonautica translated by Robert Cooper Seaton (1853-1915), R. C. Loeb Classical Library Volume 001. London, William Heinemann Ltd, 1912. Online version at the Topos Text Project.
 Apollonius Rhodius, Argonautica. George W. Mooney. London. Longmans, Green. 1912. Greek text available at the Perseus Digital Library.
 Dares Phrygius, from The Trojan War. The Chronicles of Dictys of Crete and Dares the Phrygian translated by Richard McIlwaine Frazer, Jr. (1931-). Indiana University Press. 1966. Online version at theio.com
 Dictys Cretensis, from The Trojan War. The Chronicles of Dictys of Crete and Dares the Phrygian translated by Richard McIlwaine Frazer, Jr. (1931-). Indiana University Press. 1966. Online version at the Topos Text Project.
 Gaius Julius Hyginus, Fabulae from The Myths of Hyginus translated and edited by Mary Grant. University of Kansas Publications in Humanistic Studies. Online version at the Topos Text Project.
 Homer, The Iliad with an English Translation by A.T. Murray, Ph.D. in two volumes. Cambridge, MA., Harvard University Press; London, William Heinemann, Ltd. 1924. Online version at the Perseus Digital Library.
 Homer, Homeri Opera in five volumes. Oxford, Oxford University Press. 1920. Greek text available at the Perseus Digital Library.

Children of Poseidon
Argonauts
People of the Trojan War